Abdul Malik Baloch (—) was the 21st Chief Minister of Balochistan, Pakistan from 7 June 2013 to 23 December 2015. He was born in Turbat District, Makran and he is a member of the Hooth tribe.

He is the president of National Party. He was the first non-tribal leader to serve as Chief Minister of Balochistan. Malik was succeeded by Sanaullah Zehri, leader of the Zehri tribe, upon Malik's resignation in accordance with the Murree political power sharing agreement.

Baloch campaigned to root out corruption from the province He has a good relationship with the federal government and has taken on several companies from federal to Baloch government, hoping to increase provincial revenues

Baloch also favours peace talks with militants in his province. Levels of violence and targeted killings declined relative to previous governments while the construction of electricity and roads upgraded Balochistan's infrastructure. This came as Balochistan had most of its development released, a first in Pakistani history.

Early life
He received his early education from a local school in Turbat and his intermediate education from Ata Shad Degree College, also in Turbat. He went on to pursue his MBBS degree at Lund Medical College. He specialized in ophthalmology.

Political career
Baloch started his political career under the platform of Baloch Student Organization (BSO).  Later in 1988, with the collaboration of his senior political fellows he established a nationalist political party, Balochistan National Movement. He contested election the same year. He won his Balochistan National Assembly seat and became the provincial health minister in Nawab Akbar Khan Bugti's cabinet. He also served as the provincial education minister in 1993.

In 2004, the followers of Mir Ghaus Bakhsh Bizenjo merged with the BNM and became the National Party. He was elected to the senate in 2006.

He has worked as a member of various standing committees of the Senate, including the committees on minorities affairs, ports and shipping, and food and agriculture. He was the chairman of the 'Functional Committee on Problems of Less Developed Areas'. In 2008, he was elected as President of National Party. He became Chief Minister of Balochistan on 7 June 1998.

Chief Minister (2013-2015)
Baloch was elected CM with a strong mandate from his own party and the PkMAP. After beginning his tenure as Chief Minister he began to preside over reforms such as in the field of health where in July 2013 he dismissed all absentee doctors from the Chaman Civil Hospital after making a surprise visit, reprimanded the hospital for poor sanitation and promised an investigation into the selling of prescribed medicine by hospital staff illegally

Health Minister
He served as provincial health minister in 1988–1990. Malik is a medical doctor and eye specialist, he has got the degree of MBBS from Bolan Medical College Quetta. He has been very active in his efforts for the betterment of education and health services in Balochistan.

Education Minister
In 1983, he was appointed education minister. During his tenure he established a network of schools and colleges in Balochistan, focusing on Makran.

Struggle for provincial autonomy
Baloch has been a member of the Parliamentary Committee on Constitutional Reforms which has introduced Eighteen Constitutional Amendment in the 1973 Constitution of Pakistan which inserted  provincial autonomy in the Eighteen Constitutional Amendment.

References

External links 
 

Baloch nationalists
Baloch people
Members of the Senate of Pakistan
National Party (Pakistan) politicians
People from Kech District
Tumandars
Living people
Chief Ministers of Balochistan, Pakistan
Pakistani ophthalmologists
Balochistan MPAs 2013–2018
1958 births
Deputy chairmen of the Senate of Pakistan